The 2010 Mississippi Valley State Delta Devils football team represented Mississippi Valley State University during the 2010 NCAA Division I FCS football season.

Schedule

References

Mississippi Valley State
Mississippi Valley State Delta Devils football seasons
College football winless seasons
Mississippi Valley State Delta Devils football